Fortress is a 1992 science fiction action film directed by Stuart Gordon and shot at Warner Bros. Movie World in Queensland, Australia. The story takes place in a dystopian future. The main character, John Henry Brennick (Christopher Lambert) and his wife Karen B. Brennick (Loryn Locklin) are sent to a maximum security prison because she is pregnant with a second child, which is against a strict one-child policy.

The film was a financial success, but critical reviews were mixed.

A sequel, Fortress 2: Re-Entry, was released in 2000, with Lambert reprising his role.

Plot 

In 2017, ex-army officer John Henry Brennick and his wife Karen are attempting to cross the Canada–United States border to Vancouver to have a second child. A strict one-child policy forbids a second pregnancy, even after the loss of the firstborn, so Karen wears a magnetic vest to conceal her pregnancy from the security scanners. A guard notices the vest and raises the alarm.

Brennick is caught, believing Karen to have escaped, and sentenced to thirty-one years at the Fortress, a private 30-level maximum security prison run by the Men-Tel Corporation. Brennick and other arriving prisoners are shown a video introduction informing them that they will be used as slave labor to further expand the Fortress as part of the prevailing prison-industrial complex. To maintain discipline, all inmates are implanted with "Intestinators" which induce severe pain or death as a form of physical control and mental conditioning. The prison is run by Director Poe, who oversees Zed-10, a computer that monitors day-to-day activities. The prison is located underground, in the middle of the desert, inside a deep pit that can only be crossed by a retractable bridge, while the prisoners are kept in overcrowded cells secured by laser walls.

John is imprisoned with inmates Abraham, a model prisoner who works as Poe's manservant and is awaiting parole; D-Day, a machine and demolitions expert; young offender Nino Gomez; and Stiggs, who tries to extort John. John learns that Karen has been captured and is held in an upper level with their unborn child who, being illegal, is now officially owned by Men-Tel and will be confiscated at birth.

Stiggs has a friend, Maddox, who repeatedly intimidates John; the two are involved in a brawl which culminates with Maddox being shot by a security turret before he falls to his death. John manages to grab Maddox's Intestinator and gives it to D-Day before he is taken away to be subjected to a mind-wipe procedure as punishment.

Poe, infatuated with Karen, tells her that if she lives with him, he will treat John well and release him from the mind-wipe chamber. She accepts to help John. Poe is revealed to be a cyborg, powerfully enhanced by Men-Tel cybernetics. Four months later, a heavily pregnant Karen manages to use her access to the prison computer in Poe's quarters to help John by restoring him from his mind-wiped state. Karen steals a holographic map and gives it to Abraham to give to John. Meanwhile, D-Day dismantles Maddox's Intestinator and uses a magnetic component to pull out the others' Intestinators.

During their next work shift, John's group puts their Intestinators in an air-duct and stage a brawl, causing Zed to trigger the devices and blow the duct open to prepare their escape. Poe promptly flushes the duct with steam and sends in "Strike Clones", networked cyborgs armed with flamethrowers and machine guns. Stiggs surrenders and gets shot dead, but the rest of the group kill a Strike Clone, steal its weaponry and use it to destroy the remaining Clones.

Zed alerts Poe of Karen's actions. He reveals to her that her child, like all Men-Tel-owned babies, will be extracted in a fatal Caesarean to be made a cyborg. Abraham and Karen try to resist but are powerless against the cyborg Poe, and Abraham dies of strangulation.
 
Hijacking one of the gun turrets and using it as an elevator, John's group travels to Zed's control room. John takes Poe hostage and orders him to release Karen. Poe gives the order, but Zed refuses the command, stating that Men-Tel does not engage in any negotiations during hostage situations before a gun turret blasts Poe, blowing him to pieces and leaving John's group with no leverage. Once brought over to the core computer, D-Day hacks into Zed and accesses a powerful feedback virus confiscated at the start of his sentence. He manages to activate the virus after being shot and incapacitated, triggering a complete system crash and causing all automated security to fail, releasing all of the prisoners who promptly escape. John and Gomez rescue Karen, hijack a truck, and they escape to Mexico where Karen enters labour in an abandoned barn and gives birth to her and John's child.

Cast 
 Christopher Lambert as John Henry Brennick, the main protagonist and former captain in the black berets
 Loryn Locklin as Karen B. Brennick, John's wife and a former computer programmer in the Army
 Annika Thomas as Brennick Baby
 Kurtwood Smith as Prison Director Poe
 Clifton Collins, Jr. (credited as Clifton Gonzalez-Gonzalez) as Nino Gomez, John's young cellmate
 Carolyn Purdy-Gordon as Voice of Zed-10, the computer system that oversees the prison
 Lincoln Kilpatrick as Abraham, a prison trusty
 Jeffrey Combs as "D-Day", a computer geek
 Vernon Wells as Maddox, the prison bully
 Tom Towles as Stiggs, Maddox's buddy
 Warwick Capper as Braindead Prisoner, a prisoner who was mind-wiped (cameo) (uncredited)
 John Pierce as Moustached Prisoner (uncredited)

Release

Home media
Fortress was released on VHS and Laserdisc in 1994 by Live Home Video, and re-released along with the DVD in 1999 by Artisan Entertainment. Columbia TriStar also released the film on VHS, Laserdisc and DVD in some other territories in 1993–2004, while Sony Pictures Home Entertainment re-released the DVDs from 2006–2017. The film also released on DVDs with Full Uncut Editions in UK and Germany. The film was released on Blu-ray for the first time on 27 January 2013 by Echo Bridge Home Entertainment and released in Spain on 9 December 2015 by Resen. In July 2017, Nameless Media (under the label of SPHE) also released the film on Blu-ray and DVD, including a Steelbook covers and a figurine model of the Strike Clone.

Alternative ending
The original ending of Fortress has been edited from some versions of the film. After reaching Mexico, Brennick, his wife, and Gomez end up at a barn where she starts going into labor. Gomez goes out to the truck to get a blanket for the soon-to-arrive baby. The Fortress computer, Zed-10, manages to establish a remote linkup with the truck, overriding its internal controls. The truck suddenly comes to life and runs Gomez down, killing him. Brennick shoots the truck with the Strike Clone machine gun until it seems to jam. He then sets it on fire with the flamethrower attachment. The truck crashes into the barn, exploding. Brennick climbs into the burning ruins to find his wife sitting against an old tractor, clutching her newborn baby.

Reception

Box office 
Fortress grossed A$2,855,154 at the box office in Australia. Internationally it grossed a total of US$40 million, turning into a profitable movie for having been shot with a budget of $12,000,000.

Critical response
The film received mixed reviews from critics. Stephen Holden of The New York Times said: "Like so many other futuristic movies, Fortress is a lot better at setting up its premise than in developing a story around it, [but] for all its faults, [it] has an unusually energetic imagination. At its best, it blends RoboCop, The Handmaid's Tale, and Brave New World into something scary, original and grimly amusing".

Cult cinema writer David Harkin suggests that "Fortress carries on the tropes of countless prison movies: badass cellmates, a seemingly escapable prison, and a sadistic prison warden".

Nathan Shumate of Cold Fusion Video Reviews said: "It’s a good little film, kept very interesting by a multitude of plot twists. [...] The beauty of this movie is that it’s not terribly ambitious; [director Stuart] Gordon knew that it was not meant to be this generation’s defining science fiction film, and so instead had fun with it. The characters are colorful and engaging, and the actors are b-movie all-stars; the story moves along at a fair clip; and the prison itself is a novel setting, with plenty of inconsistencies in future technology but none that sit up and insist that you notice them".

James Berardinelli of ReelViews said: "Fortress has [...] an impressive visual style, [...] the set design is excellent, and the action scenes are well-paced, [but it's] hampered by a poorly-constructed story line [and] never gets on track. Instead of entering the rarefied atmosphere inhabited by such films as Aliens and the original Terminator, it falls in line with the likes of Freejack and Alien 3".

Sequel

A sequel titled Fortress 2: Re-Entry, was released in 2000.

See also 
 List of films featuring surveillance
 List of prison films
 Private prison
 Prison-industrial complex

References

External links 
 
 
 
 
 Fortress at Oz Movies

1992 independent films
1990s prison films
1990s science fiction action films
1990s dystopian films
1992 films
American science fiction action films
Australian action adventure films
Australian independent films
Australian science fiction action films
American dystopian films
1990s English-language films
Films about prison escapes
Films directed by Stuart Gordon
Films set in 2017
Films set in the future
Overpopulation fiction
Davis Entertainment films
Village Roadshow Pictures films
Dimension Films films
Columbia Pictures films
Films shot on the Gold Coast, Queensland
1990s American films